Ami Aspelund (born Anne-Marie Aspelund on 7 September 1953 in Vaasa) is a Finnish singer. She is the younger sister of singer Monica Aspelund.

Career

Ami Aspelund released her first single in 1973 called "Apinamies", which is a Finnish version of Jungle Jim's "Big Fat Orang Uman".

Aspelund participated in the Rostock Festival in 1981, and in the Eurovision Song Contest 1983 with the song "Fantasiaa" ("Fantasy", music by Kari Kuusamo and  lyrics by Kaisu Liuhala) finishing in 11th place with 41 points.

Her debut album was published in 1974 and she has published many albums, sung both in Finnish and in her native language Swedish.

Discography

Albums
 Ami (1974)
 Credo - minä uskon (1975)
 Karibu (1975)
 Yön jälkeen (1976)
 Cascade (1976)
 Fågel blå (1978)
 Sinilintu (1978)
 Tänään huipulla (1982)
 Fantasy dream (1983)
 Framtidens skugga (1983)
 Fenor och vingar (1986)
 Rio Herne (1994)
 Sylvian paluu (1997)
 Sylvias återkomst (1996)
 20 suosikkia tänään huipulla (2000)
 Ami Live! (2005)
 Pärlor (2005)
 På resa! (2008)

Singles
 "Apinamies" / "Bumerangi" (1973)
 "Waterloo" / "Kun pois hän on" (1974)
 "Tänään huipulla" / "Tiedä mitä tahdot" (1974)
 "Mä halusin niin" / "Suukkosuma" (1975)
 "Päivä kaunein on tullut" / "Nuoruuteni on ohiv (1975)
 "Koska sun taas nähdä saan" / "Ja rakastan vielä" (1975)
 "Chanson d'amour" / "Onnen hetket" (1977)
 "Vapaana" / "Ihmeiden aika" (1977)
 "Sinilintu" / "Charleston" (1978)
 "Fågel blå" / "Charleston" (1978)
 "Fågel blau" / "Der erste Flug" (1982)
 "Mitt äppelträd" / "Fågel blå" (1982)
 "You are my life" (Ami Aspelund ja Jokke Seppälä) / "Flight 205" (Jokke Seppälä) (1982)
 "Rakkaudesta ystävyyteen" / "Tahtoo lisää" (1983)
 "Fantasiaa" / "Fantasy dream" (1983)
 "Clown" / "Private secretary" (1983)

References

External links

 Ami Aspelund's Official Page

1953 births
Living people
Eurovision Song Contest entrants of 1983
Eurovision Song Contest entrants for Finland
20th-century Finnish women singers
Swedish-speaking Finns
21st-century Finnish women singers